A by-election was held for the New South Wales Legislative Assembly electorate of Tamworth on 10 August 1940 because of the death of Frank Chaffey.

The UAP held a five-way preselection which was won by Chaffey's son, Bill Chaffey, a farmer who had returned to the district about twelve months previously. He won preselection over Tamworth station agent P. Marsh, grazier and Peel River Shire councillor J. Scott, Tamworth grain expert W. H. Lye and former federal MP Roland Green. The Country Party did not contest the seat after forming an agreement with the UAP, mindful of the UAP having not contested an earlier by-election in the Country Party-held seat of Upper Hunter. Two Labor parties contested the seat as a result of the second Lang Labor split: insurance agent and future MP Thomas Ryan (for the Labor Party (Non-Communist)) and solicitor John Lyons (for the official Labor Party).

Chaffey comfortably won the seat with a majority of the primary vote.

Dates

Results

Frank Chaffey died.

See also
Electoral results for the district of Tamworth
List of New South Wales state by-elections

Notes

References

1940 elections in Australia
New South Wales state by-elections
1940s in New South Wales